William Quarles (1800–1879) was an English first-class cricketer associated with Norfolk who was active in the 1820s. He also played for Suffolk.  Quarles' batting style is unknown.

Quarles made a single first-class appearance for Norfolk against the Marylebone Cricket Club (MCC) at Lord's in 1820.  The MCC scored 473 all out in their first-innings, in response Norfolk managed just 92, with Quarles batting at number eleven and ending unbeaten on 0.  The MCC fared less well in their second-innings with a total of 108.  This gave them a lead of 489 over Norfolk, which was more than enough as Norfolk were dismissed for 72, with Quarles himself making 2 runs before he was dismissed by William Ward.  The MCC's final margin of victory was 417 runs.  A decade later he appeared in his second first-class match, this time for Suffolk against the MCC at Field Lane, Bury St Edmunds.  The MCC made 100 all out in their first-innings, with Suffolk making 74 in response, with Quarles being dismissed for a duck by Herbert Jenner.  The MCC were bowled out for 68 in their second-innings, leaving Suffolk with a total of 95 to chase.  However, Suffolk well just short in being bowled out for 82, with Quarles contributing 4 to the total before he was dismissed by Ned Wenman.

References

External links
 

English cricketers
Norfolk cricketers
Suffolk cricketers
English cricketers of 1787 to 1825
1800 births
1879 deaths
People from Broadland (district)
Sportspeople from Norfolk